Nichole "Vapor" Ayers is a major in the United States Air Force and NASA astronaut candidate. She is currently a resident of Colorado Springs, Colorado.

Education
Nichole Ayers graduated from Woodland Park High School in Woodland Park, Colorado. Afterwards, she attended the United States Air Force Academy (USAFA), where she graduated a bachelor's degree in mathematics (with a minor in Russian) in 2011. She earned a master's degree in computational and applied mathematics from Rice University in 2013.

Career
In 2014, Nichole Ayers completed flight training, and flew the T-38 for an adversary squadron at Langley Air Force Base. She later became a flight instructor, providing adversary training to F-22 Raptor units based at Langley. In 2018, Ayers completed training for the F-22, and currently serves as a flight instructor for the F-22. Ayers has logged more than 200 flight hours during Operation Inherent Resolve. At the time of her selection as an Astronaut Candidate, Ayers was the assistant director of operations of the 90th Fighter Squadron at Elmendorf Air Force Base.

Astronaut candidacy
On December 6, 2021, Nichole Ayers was revealed to be one of ten candidates selected as part NASA Astronaut Group 23.

Awards and honors
Ayers was a distinguished graduate of the USAFA and Undergraduate Pilot Training. She has received the Meritorious Service Medal, Air Medal, Aerial Achievement Medal, Air Force Commendation Medal, and the Operation Inherent Resolve Campaign Medal.

References

1980s births
Year of birth uncertain
Living people
Rice University alumni
United States Air Force astronauts
Astronaut candidates
United States Air Force Academy alumni